Oaks Green is a village in Derbyshire, England. It is in the civil parish of Doveridge.

External links

Villages in Derbyshire
Derbyshire Dales